Gaussan Abbey is a Benedictine monastery situated at Bizanet in the Aude, France.

Cistercians
The site was originally established in the 12th century by the Cistercians as a grange of the nearby Fontfroide Abbey. Fontfroide was dissolved and its buildings and assets, including the grange at Gaussan, were sold off in 1791 during the French Revolution.

Private ownership
During the later 19th and 20th centuries the buildings were refurbished by the proprietor, Charles Lambert de Sainte-Croix, who also developed the land for viticulture

Benedictines
The property was later acquired by the Benedictines and in 1994 a monastery was founded here as a priory of Fontgombault Abbey.

It became an abbey in 2004.

It is part of the Solesmes Congregation of the Benedictine Confederation and as such focusses on Gregorian chant and the Tridentine Mass.

The monks also produce wine.

Sources
 Bizanet Village website: page on Gaussan Abbey

Benedictine monasteries in France
Christian organizations established in 1984
Christian monasteries in Aude
1984 establishments in France